State Route 366 (SR 366) is the unsigned designation for the  northern beltway around the city of Humboldt in Gibson County, Tennessee. Throughout its length, the highway is signed as U.S. Route 45W (US 45W), US 70A Bypass, and US 79 Bypass.

Route description

The highway begins as a two-lane highway at an interchange with US 70A/US 79 (W Main Street/SR 76 at the southwestern edge of town. It heads north through some industrial areas, where it has an intersection with SR 152. The highway then curves to the east through more industrial areas to cross a railroad overpass and enter a business district and come to an intersection with US 45W and US 45W Business (N Central Avenue/SR 5), where it widens to a four-lane highway and US 45W joins the highway. They then pass through some neighborhoods, where they cross over another railroad overpass, before US 70A Bypass/US 79 Bypass come to an end at an intersection with US 70A/US 79 (Eastend Drive/SR 76), with the Humboldt Bypass, and unsigned SR 366, continuing south along US 45W.  The highway now curves to the south and passes through more rural areas, where it has an intersection with SR 152 (E Mitchell Street), shortly before coming to an end at an intersection with US 45W Business (E Main Street/SR 5), with the road continuing south towards Three Way as US 45W (SR 5).

Major intersections

References

366
Transportation in Gibson County, Tennessee